Jan Otto Kvalheim  is a Norwegian handball player.

He made his debut on the Norwegian national team in 1967, 
and played 32 matches for the national team between 1967 and 1970. He participated at the 1970 World Men's Handball Championship.

References

Year of birth missing (living people)
Living people
Norwegian male handball players